= Measurement and Evaluation in Counseling and Development =

Peer-reviewed applied psychology journal

- Language: English
- Edited by: Bradley Erford

Publication details
- Former names: Measurement and Evaluation in Guidance
- History: 1968–present
- Publisher: Taylor and Francis
- Frequency: Quarterly
- Impact factor: 1.089 (2018)

Standard abbreviations
- ISO 4: Meas. Eval. Couns. Dev.

Indexing
- ISSN: 0748-1756
- LCCN: 84651506
- OCLC no.: 45114565

Links
- Journal homepage; Online access; Online archive

Measurement and Evaluation in Counseling and Development is a peer-reviewed academic journal that publishes papers in the field of Psychology. The journal's editor is Bradley Erford (Vanderbilt University). It has been in publication since 2009 and is currently published by Taylor and Francis is association with Association for Assessment and Research in Counseling, a member association of the American Counseling Association.

== Abstracting and indexing ==
Measurement and Evaluation in Counseling and Development is abstracted and indexed in, among other databases: SCOPUS, and the Social Sciences Citation Index. According to the Journal Citation Reports, its 2018 impact factor is 1.089, ranking it 62 out of 82 journals in the category ‘Psychology, Applied’. and 49 out of 59 journals in the category ‘Psychology, Educational’.
